The Botswana National Broadcasting Board (NBB) was set up by the Broadcasting Act, 1998 (No. 6 of 1999). 
The Board consists of eleven members who were appointed in August 2000.
Section 10 of the Act, includes Board functions such as the issuing of broadcasting licences and the control and supervision of broadcasting activities, including the relaying of radio and television programmes from places in and out of Botswana to places in and outside Botswana.

Mandate

Roles (Summary)
  Act as general advisor to National Broadcasting Board (NBB)
  Act as a support link between Botswana Telecommunications Authority (BTA) and NBB
  Recommend code of conduct
  Monitor global broadcast developments
  Broadcast representation nationally, regionally and internationally

Licensing
The NBB issues licences on the following types of broadcasting services in Botswana.
  Public broadcasting
  Private broadcasting and
  Community broadcasting

Highlights and Controversies
  2007: National Broadcasting Board v Multichoice Botswana. The Board issued a broadcasting licence to Multichoice in 2005, and subsequently, in 2007, made an order setting aside the decision to issue the licence. The Court of Appeal decided that
the NBB had acted ultra vires its powers in licensing Multichoice Botswana as a broadcaster.
  2008 - Digital Migration Strategy:  The NBB highlighted the need for the development of the digital migration strategy to the Minister at a meeting in December 2007. The BTA is expected to play a significant role in this task

Botswana's ISDB-T
Features:

 Supports ISDB-T broadcast (1 segment).
 MPEG-2/ MPEG-4 AVC/ H.264 HD/ SD video.
 DiVX Compatible with 480i/ 480p/ 720p/ 1080i/ 1080p video formats. Auto and Manually scan all available TV and radio channels. 
 Aspect ratio 16:9 and 4:3.
 1000 channels memory. 
 Parental control. 
 Teletext/ Bit Map Subtitle. 
 Compliant with ETS1.
 Supported 7 days EPG fiction. 
 VBI Teletext support 6 MHz software setting auto/ manual program search. 
 Multi language supported.

See also

 Botswana
 Internet in Botswana
 Botswana Internet Exchange
 Botswana Telecommunications Authority

References

External links
 Botswana Broadcasting Regulations
 Code of Conduct for Broadcasters during Elections
 Laws of Botswana

Mass media in Botswana
Organizations established in 2000
2000 establishments in Botswana